110 Squadron is a territorial reserve squadron of the South African Air Force.  The squadron operations include VIP transport, coastal reconnaissance flights, command and control in crime prevention operations in conjunction with the South African Police and South African Army.  The squadron is based at AFB Ysterplaat.

References

Squadrons of the South African Air Force
Military units and formations in Cape Town
Territorial Reserve Squadrons of the South African Air Force